Richard Smith (April 1890 – 1940) was an English footballer who played in the Football League for Stoke. He made one hundred and nine appearances for Stoke.

Career
After starting his career with Newcastle Town and Crewe Alexandra, Smith signed for Stoke in 1916 during the war-time season when he was free of army duty. He made his mark during the following season in the 1917–18 season, appearing in 32 regional games, and adding 28 to his tally the following term. When peacetime football returned in 1919 he was regarded as a key member of the first team and went on to make just over 100 league appearances for the "Potters" in three seasons before retiring due to injury in 1922.

Career statistics

References

English footballers
Sportspeople from Newcastle-under-Lyme
Crewe Alexandra F.C. players
Stoke City F.C. players
English Football League players
1897 births
Newcastle Town F.C. players
1940 deaths
Association football midfielders